Where Do We Go from Here: Chaos or Community? is a 1967 book by African-American minister, Nobel Peace Prize laureate, and social justice campaigner Martin Luther King Jr. Advocating for human rights and a sense of hope, it was King's fourth and last book before his 1968 assassination.

Writing and print history
King spent a long period in isolation, living in a rented residence in Jamaica with no telephone, composing the book.

It later lapsed out of print until Beacon Press published an expanded edition in 2010, which featured a new introduction passage by King's long-time friend Vincent Gordon Harding and a foreword by King's wife, Coretta Scott King. The revamped version was highlighted as a 2011 University Press Book for Public and Secondary School Libraries and recommended for use in teaching.

Contents

One of the central themes of the book's messages is that of hope. King reflects upon the Civil Rights Movement. He discusses the question of what African-Americans should do with their new freedoms found in laws such as the Voting Rights Act of 1965. He concludes that all Americans must unite in order to fight poverty and create an equality of opportunity. King emphasizes that he is neither a Marxist nor a doctrinaire socialist; he instead advocates for a united social movement that would act within both the Republican and Democratic parties.

Establishing a clear contrast between his own views and that of the Black Power movement, King argues that abandoning the fight for nonviolent social change and replacing it with personal militarism tinged with black separatism is both immoral and self-defeating. He also criticizes moderate American whites for having inaccurate, unrealistic views of the ongoing plight of African-Americans, even after legal reforms undertaken under U.S. President Lyndon B. Johnson, and he asserts that radical change is still not only just but necessary. The then ongoing Vietnam War represents, in King's eyes, an immense waste of resources as well as a distraction from pressing domestic issues, the cost in lost lives making it all even worse.

In economic terms specifically, the author cites economic thinker Henry George's Progress and Poverty while writing in support of broadly Georgist ideas, with King quoting George's text that "the work which extends knowledge and increases power and enriches literature ... is not the work of slaves, driven to their task either by the lash of a master or by animal necessities." King concludes that, rather than having a mere welfare state or a general class struggle, U.S. government measures should act more directly to benefit individuals by some kind of guaranteed income:

Reception and lasting legacy
Cornel West, who has held professorships and fellowships at Harvard University, Dartmouth College, Princeton University, Yale University, Pepperdine University, Union Theological Seminary, and the University of Paris and authored books such as Race Matters, remarked:

King's argument for a basic income system to improve the U.S. economy and statements against wealth inequality have been cited by a wide variety of later publications. Examples include academic and economist Guy Standing's 2014 book A Precariat Charter: From Denizens to Citizens and professor P.L. Thomas' 2012 book Ignoring Poverty in the U.S.: The Corporate Takeover of Public Education. The revamped 2010 version of King's work was highlighted in a 2011 University Press Book for Public and Secondary School Libraries, and was recommended for use in teaching.

See also

 1967 in literature
 Guaranteed minimum income
 Martin Luther King Jr.#Legacy

References

External links

 thekingcenter.org

1967 non-fiction books
Beacon Press books
Works by Martin Luther King Jr.
Books about human rights
Books about race and ethnicity